Coutts Trotter may refer to:
 Coutts Trotter (physicist) (1837–1887)
 Coutts Trotter (writer) (1831–1906)